Louis S. Warren (born December 8, 1962) is an American historian and a W. Turrentine Jackson Professor of Western U.S. History at the University of California, Davis, where he teaches environmental history, the history of the American West, and U.S. history.

Early life and education
Warren was born in Pocatello, Idaho he is the third child of Claude and Elizabeth Warren.

Warren attended a two-room schoolhouse in the ghost town of Goodsprings, Nevada, and attended Basic High School in Henderson, Nevada.
He was a British American Education Foundation Scholar at Cranleigh School, Surrey, UK, in 1980 – 81, and did his undergraduate work in history at Columbia University in New York, where he graduated in 1985.

He became a teacher at Peterhouse School in Zimbabwe from 1985 until 1987.

In 1988, he began graduate study at Yale University, where he received his Ph.D. in history in 1993.

Professional career 
In addition to teaching at UC Davis, Warren has written or edited several books on US Western and Environmental History. He is the co-editor of Boom: A Journal of California.

Awards 
He has received numerous awards for his writing, including:
1997 the National Cowboy Hall of Fame Wrangler Award for Best Non-Fiction Book.
2005 the Great Plains Distinguished Book Prize.
2006 Albert Beveridge Prize of the American Historical Association
2006 Caughey-Western History Association Prize of the Western History Association.
2006 Western Writers of America Spur Award for Historical Nonfiction.
2011 Guggenheim Fellowship for US History.
2018 Bancroft Prize.

Publications

Reviews

References

External links

21st-century American historians
21st-century American male writers
Living people
1962 births
People educated at Cranleigh School
Bancroft Prize winners
American male non-fiction writers
Columbia College (New York) alumni
Yale Graduate School of Arts and Sciences alumni
University of California, Davis faculty